Leptostylus dealbatus is a species of beetle in the family Cerambycidae. It was described by Jacquelin du Val in Sagra in 1857.

References

Leptostylus
Beetles described in 1857